The Tule River Indian Tribe of the Tule River Reservation is a federally recognized tribe of Native Americans. The Tule River Reservation is located in Tulare County, California. The reservation was made up of Yokuts, about 200 Yowlumne, Wukchumnis, and Western Mono and Tübatulabal. Tribal enrollment today is approximately 1,857 with 1,033 living on the Reservation.

History

Tule River Farm
For thousands of years, this area was inhabited by varying cultures of indigenous peoples. Historic tribes encountered by Europeans in the area included the Yokuts, Mono and Tübatulabal. The area was first colonized by the Spanish and Mexicans, followed by European Americans after the US victory in the Mexican–American War in 1848.

After the Owens Valley Indian War and Following the Tule River Indian War of 1856, the Tule River Farm, a farm attached to the Tejon Agency, was established in 1858 at the base of the foothills, near the present town of Porterville. In 1860, Thomas Madden, an Indian service employee, gained personal title to the Tule River Farm, by using state school warrants. The federal government rented the Tule River Farm and paid Madden $1,000 per year.

Tule River Reservation
In 1864, the Tule River Farm became the Tule River Reservation, one of five Indian reservations authorized by Congress.  When the United States defeated Half the Owens Valley Paiutes in the Owens Valley Indian War of 1863, they were removed to the reservation, whose population nearly doubled. In 1864, the population consisted of 450 Tule River Indians and 350 Owens River Indians who were relocated there from Fort Tejon.

The owens valley Paiutes were frightening settlers around the growing town of Porterville. The settlers began to demand removal of the Indians on the Tule River Farm to a more distant location. Indian agents clamored to provide the Indians with a more permanent home. Some also argued the need to separate the Indians from unscrupulous individuals who entered the reservation to entice the Indians to buy cheap liquor. As a result, the Tule River Indian Reservation was relocated; in 1873 it was established by Presidential Executive Order of Ulysses S. Grant as a homeland for Tule River, Kings River, Owens River, Monache Cajon and other scattered bands of Indians.

While the Tule River Indian Tribe includes [[Owens valley Paiutes and Tübatulabal members, the majority of the tribe are Yokuts. Traditionally, 60 Yokuts tribes lived-in south-central California to the east of Porterville. By the end of the 19th century their population was reduced by 75% due to warfare and high fatalities from European diseases. The surviving Yokuts banded together on the Tule River Reservation, including the Yowlumne, Wukchumni bands of Yokut. In 1917, some Kitanemuk people also lived in the reservation.

Government
The tribe ratified their current tribal constitution in 1936 and last amended it in 1974. Their Tribal Council is democratically elected and includes a Chairman, Vice Chairman, Secretary, and Treasurer and five Council Members. The Tule River Tribal Council Consists of nine council members. Each member is voted for by the Tule River Tribal Members. The elected officials then decide who will perform functions of Chairman, Vice Chairman, Secretary and Treasurer.

Current officers are:

 Chairman
 Vice-Chairman
 Secretary
 Treasurer
 Member
 Member
 Member
 Member
 Member

The main piece of governing legislation is the Tule River Indian Tribe Constitution and Bylaws approved January 15, 1936.

Reservation
The Tule River Reservation was established in 1873 by a US Executive Order in the foothills of the Sierra Nevada. The reservation is the site of Painted Rock, an ancient petroglyph site. Located south of Fresno and north of Bakersfield, it occupies . 566 tribal members live on the reservation. Accessible only by one winding  up into the mountains, the nearest town is East Porterville and/or Springville.

Due to the failure of wells in August 2022, families on the reservation had to use bottled water for drinking, cooking, and bathing.

Programs
The tribe operates many programs to serve its members including a health clinic, a child care center, an adult and vocational education center, a college scholarship program, a housing authority, and a chemical dependency treatment center.

Healthcare 

The Tule River Indian Health Center is a 501 (c) (3) non-profit organization founded in 1973 and dedicated to meeting the healthcare and health education needs of the Native American communities in Tulare County.

Tule River Indian Health Center is governed by a Health Advisory Board composed of local tribal members from the Tule River Indian Reservation.

Economy
The Tule River Tribe has three enterprises that assist the tribe in making their community a better place. Through these enterprises, the Tule River Tribe is able to be a self-sufficient entity improving the everyday lives of their members.

Eagle Mountain Casino

Eagle Mountain Casino is the only full service casino in Tulare County, open 24 hours a day. It has over 1400 slot machines, 12 table games, live poker tournaments, the River Steakhouse and dining options. On April 6, 2021, Tule River Tribe broke ground on the new property for Eagle Mountain Casino, to be moved from the reservation to Porterville. It will open in fall 2022.

Eagle Feather Trading Post
Eagle Feather Trading Post is one of the largest convenience stores in Tulare County, located on Hwy 190 just above Lake Success. The store has a full line of groceries; cold beer, wine, fishing and bait supplies. They carry National and Native brands of cigarettes and tobacco products. Gas, diesel, and propane are the cheapest price available. For the RVers they also have a free dump station and a pet run. Plenty of parking is available for customers, with security on site 24 hours a day.

Oral history
Many of the stories told by the elders of the Tule River Indian reservation have been handed down from generation to generation. Almost all of these stories reflect the ways and life of the Tule River Tribes. All of the stories, however, carry a strong message to the youth and adults in the region.

 Painted Rock
 Coyote and the Moon
 Coyote and the Sun
 Big Foot, The Hairy Man
 Soda Springs

Education
The reservation is mostly served by the Porterville Unified School District with a small portion of it served by the Springville Union Elementary School District.

See also
 Sebastian Indian Reservation
 Tejon Indian Tribe of California

References

Further reading

External links
 Official Tule River Bands of the Tule River Reservation website

Native American tribes in California
Federally recognized tribes in the United States
Mono tribe
Yokuts
San Joaquin Valley
Tulare County, California